Incredible is the fifth studio album of singer songwriter Ilse DeLange.

Track listing
 Broken Girl
 Something Amazing
 Stay With Me
 Miracle
 So Incredible
 We're Alright
 Adrift
 Puzzle Me
 Love Won't Hide
 Nothing Left to Break
 The Other Side
 Fall

Charts

Weekly charts

Year-end charts

References

External links
 Official Website
 Official Myspace

2008 albums
Ilse DeLange albums